Fervença River is a river in Portugal. It goes through Bragança.

References

Rivers of Portugal